This is a list of episodes of the anime series Jubei-chan: The Ninja Girl-The Secret of the Lovely Eyepatch produced by Madhouse. The series first aired on 5 April 1999 and concluded on 28 June 1999. The second series: The Counter Attack of the Siberian Yagyu premiered in 2004.

Episode list

1999 Japanese television seasons
Jubei-chan